"The Cowboy Captain of the Cutty Sark" is a 1998 Scrooge McDuck comic by Don Rosa. The story takes place between The Buckaroo of the Badlands and Raider of the Copper Hill in the series The Life and Times of Scrooge McDuck making it part 3B.

The story was first published in the Danish Anders And & Co. #1998-52 and 1998–53; the first American publication was in Uncle Scrooge #318, in February 1999.

Plot
The story takes place in August 1883. Scrooge exports some cattle from Montana to Indonesia but encounters a thief and meets his old friend Ratchet Gearloose from his Riverboat days. Then he becomes part of a spectacular trip aboard the clipper ship  on August 26, 1883. However, Krakatoa becomes more active, and soon enough, the volcano violently explodes. Scrooge and Gearloose have to ride out the pyroclastic flow, tsunami, and the falling pumice.

Notes
Real historical people Scrooge meets during this adventure include:
Captain F.W. Moore of the Cutty Sark
Sultan Mangkunagara V of Djokja
Sultan Pakubuwana IX of Solo
In reality, the Sultan of Djojka at the time was Hamengkubuwono VII instead of Mangkunagara V, but the error was derived from the mistake in Don Rosa's source, an 1890s traveling story titled On The Subject of Java.

External links

Disney comics stories
Donald Duck comics by Don Rosa
Fiction set in 1883
1998 in comics
Comics set in the 19th century
Comics set in Indonesia
Krakatoa
Nautical comics
The Life and Times of Scrooge McDuck
1883 eruption of Krakatoa